Oliver Morton is a British science writer and editor.  He has written for many publications, including The American Scholar (for which he has won the American Astronomical Society's 2004 David N. Schramm Award for High Energy Astrophysics Science Journalism), Discover, The Economist,  The Independent,  the Milwaukee Journal Sentinel,  National Geographic,  Nature (where he was the chief news and features editor), The New Yorker, Newsweek International, Prospect,  and Wired.

In 2016 his book The Planet Remade was shortlisted for the Royal Society Insight Investment Science Book Prize.

Morton is a fellow of the Hybrid Vigor Institute.  He has a degree in the history and philosophy of science from Cambridge University and lives with his wife in Greenwich, England.  Asteroid 10716 Olivermorton is named for him.

Books 
 Mapping Mars: Science, Imagination, and the Birth of a World.  Picador, 2002.  
 Eating the Sun: How Plants Power the Planet.  Fourth Estate, a HarperCollins imprint, 2007.  
 The Planet Remade: How Geoengineering Could Change the World.  Princeton University Press, 2016.  
 The Moon: A History for the Future. Economist Books, a Profile Books imprint, 2019.

References

British science writers
Living people
Year of birth missing (living people)